Shakereh Namazi,  Khaleeli (1945–1991), was a real estate developer and philanthropist who went missing in 1991.  The prime suspect was her own husband, Swami Shradananda, previously known as Murali Manohar Mishra. After three years on a sting operation, the Karnataka Police Force got an admission of murder from him and he also led the police to her remains buried in her own residence in 1994. He is serving life in prison.

Family and background
Shakereh was born on 27 August 1945 in Madras to a Persian Muslim family who migrated from Madras to Singapore in the early 1900s. She was the daughter of Gulam Hussain Namazie and Gauhar Taj Begum Namazie née Mirza the youngest daughter of Sir Mirza Ismail, the Diwan of Mysore, Jaipur and, Hyderabad. Her grandfather was  Mohammad Namazie, a  trader with interests in the Middle East, South East Asia and Southern India. Ghulam Hussain Namazie's was responsible for opening Capitol Theatre which was Singapore's first Cinema Hall. He was also an equestrian and involved with the Turf Club where the family horses won many prestigious trophies. Later he would join the board of the larger Namazie Group and help with their many diverse business interests especially the family's vast Real Estate portfolio, the family. Gauhar Taj was a socialite and, Philanthropist involved in many charitable organisations in Singapore. Shakereh has an elder brother Mirza Karim Namazie who used to be a Television Journalist. It was in this environment with lots of cousin's that Shakereh grew up in a very happy family.

First marriage
In 1965, at age 18, Shakereh married her first cousin Akbar Mirza Khaleeli from Madras; It was a love marriage.  Their mothers were sisters Shah Taj Begum Khaleeli need Mirza and Gauhar Taj Namazie, both daughters of Sir Mirza Ismail and Lady Mirza).

Akbar Mirza Khaleeli was an outstanding sportsman and student who completed his schooling at Bishop Cotton Boys' School, Bangalore and later, Doveton Corrie Protestant Schools Association. He studied law at Loyola College, Chennai. He was considered the best tennis player in South India by Ramesh Krishnan but instead joined the Indian Foreign Service in 1954. He went on to serve in various posts in Delhi, Baghdad, Colombo, Paris and Amman. He served as Chief of Protocol in 1976 and later served as Indian Ambassador to Iran. Shakereh was with him throughout most of his postings, except during the time of the Iranian Revolution.

While her husband was in Iran, Shakereh moved to Bangalore and engaged in construction, following her great-grandfather Agha Aly Asker, known for his buildings in Bangalore. She first built a family home on Sankey Road, Abshot Layout, and a house for her mother on Ali Asker Road. She then redeveloped other family properties, evicting some of the tenants. 
They divorced in 1984.  Akbar Khaleeli would go on to become Ambassador in Italy. High Commissioner to Australia and Advisor to the Government on Middle Eastern Affairs.
They had four daughters with Zeebundeh Khaleeli  (b. 1965 in Madras), Sabah Bakache (b. 1966 in Delhi), Rehane Yavar Dhala (b. 1969 in Paris), and Begum Esmath Khaleeli Clark (b. 1972 in Amman, Jordan).

Second marriage
Murali Manohar Mishra, who had renamed himself as Swami Shradhananda, first met Shakereh and her husband in Bangalore in 1982. Akbar Mirza Khaleeli then took up a post in Iran and, on his return, Shakereh divorced him. Six months after her divorce, in April 1986,  Shakereh "shunned her family and social norms" to marry Shradhananda. She allowed Shradhananda access to her money and property. The couple reportedly quarrelled over her relationship with her daughters.

Murder
In 1991 Sabah, Shakereh's second daughter, found that she was unable to locate her mother. Despite repeated enquiries about Shakereh's whereabouts to Shradhananda, he consistently avoided giving a proper answer. In 1992, Sabah filed for a habeas corpus at the Ashok Nagar Police Station in Bangalore. For three years Shradhananda managed to evade questions from Shakereh's family and friends, as well as legal authorities of the state. He lived lavishly in Bangalore, pretending his wife was on a perpetual holiday.

In May 1994, the police of Karnataka uncovered the skeletal remains of Shakereh's body buried deep in the courtyard of her own house. Shakereh's murder was considered one of the most heinous crimes of Indian criminal history, deeply affecting the nation.

Shakereh had been killed on 28 April 1991. She had been drugged, then placed on a mattress which was deposited in the coffin-like box, already lying in the pit that had been dug in preparation. When Shakereh's skeletal remains were recovered and the mattress was removed, one of her hands was found clutching the mattress which lay below her; this, along with other factors, supported the idea that she had been alive when buried.

Prosecution
Swami Shradhananda was taken into judicial custody after admitting to the crime. The case became an important milestone in the Indian judicial system, as it was the first case where the exhumation process was recorded on video, as well as the first time that DNA tests and videotapes of the exhumation were accepted as evidence in India.

Trial and sentence
The case was first brought to trial in late 1997. On 21 May 2005, the Civil and Sessions Judge B.S. Totad sentenced Swami to capital punishment by hanging. Shradhananda reportedly betrayed no emotions as he stood in the dock. The order read: "From the facts and circumstances of the case, it is clear that the said murder has created such a fear in the minds of the family and in the community to live peacefully in society. There are no mitigating circumstances or factors to award a lesser punishment ... having regard to the nature of the methodology in committing the murder for gain, it is a fit case for capital punishment." The judge directed the jail authorities not to execute the death sentence until they received confirmation from the high court.

On 12 September 2005 in the high court, a two-bench judge composed of Justices S.R. Bannurmath and A.C. Kabbin confirmed the death sentence. Terming it the "rarest of rare cases" in their order, the division bench stated: "The accused had murdered his wife in a diabolical and a well-planned scheme. As such, the death penalty imposed on him is liable to be confirmed. Anything less than a penalty of greatest severity for any serious crime is thought to be a measure of tolerance that is unwarranted and unwise. The sessions court is justified in awarding death penalty to the accused."

Appeal
An appeal notice was lodged in July 2005. On 18 February 2006 Shradhananda issued notice to the Karnataka Government on special leave petition (SLP) questioning the high court judgment that had confirmed the death sentence. The Supreme Court Bench of Justice Ashok Bhan and Justice Tarun Chatterjee stayed the high court judgment. On 22 July 2008 a life sentence for Shradhananda was ordered by the Indian Supreme Court in New Delhi.

References

http://www.newindpress.com/NewsItems.aspID=IEK20050521104417&Page=K&Title=Southern+News++Karnataka&Topic=0

1947 births
1991 deaths
People from Bangalore
Indian murder victims
People murdered in Karnataka
Premature burials
Deaths by live burial
1991 murders in India